The 2016–17 Scottish Cup was the 132nd season of Scotland's most prestigious football knockout competition. The tournament was sponsored by bookmaker William Hill in what was the sixth season of a nine-year partnership, after contract negotiations saw the initial five-year contract extended for an additional four years in October 2015.

The defending champions were Hibernian, who defeated Rangers in the 2016 final, but they were eliminated in the semi finals by Aberdeen.

Celtic beat Aberdeen 2–1 in the final to complete a domestic treble without losing a game in any domestic competition.

Media coverage
From round four onwards, selected matches from the Scottish Cup are broadcast live in the UK and Ireland by BBC Scotland and Sky Sports. BBC Scotland has the option to show one tie per round with Sky Sports showing two ties per round with one replay; also, Sky Sports show both semi-finals live with one also on BBC Scotland & both channels screen the final live.

Calendar
The calendar for the 2016–17 Scottish Cup qualifying rounds, as announced by Scottish Football Association.

Preliminary rounds

The draw for the preliminary rounds took place at the Coldstream Museum on Monday 18 July 2016. 

17 clubs were involved in the draw, of which seven received a bye to the second preliminary round, while the other 10 entered the first preliminary round. The teams competing in these rounds were made up of teams from the East of Scotland Football League (3), South of Scotland Football League (5), North Caledonian Football League (1), Scottish Junior Football Association (6) and the Scottish Amateur Football Association (2). 

There were three parts to the draw. The first part determined which seven clubs, from the 10 eligible, would receive a bye to the second preliminary round. The three clubs which did not receive a bye into the second preliminary round entered in the first preliminary round. Five ties were drawn in the first preliminary round to be played on Saturday, 13 August 2016. The final part of the draw saw six ties drawn in the second preliminary round to be played on Saturday, 3 September 2016.

Preliminary round 1

Draw
Teams in Bold advanced to the first round.

The following teams received a bye to the second preliminary round: Banks O’Dee, Burntisland Shipyard, Coldstream, Girvan, Golspie Sutherland, Linlithgow Rose and Threave Rovers.

Matches

Replay

Preliminary round 2

Matches

Replay

First round

The first round took place on the weekend of 24 September 2016. Along with the six winners from the second preliminary round, there were 30 new entries at this stage, 14 from the Lowland Football League and 16 from the Highland Football League. From the first round, teams were permitted to use an additional fourth substitute in the extra time period should a replayed tie go to extra time.

Draw

The draw for the first round was made on Monday, 5 September at 2:30pm. The draw took place at Edinburgh College and was made by Hibernian's cup winning captain David Gray. It was streamed live on the Scottish Cup's official Facebook page.

Teams in Italics were not known at the time of the draw. Teams in Bold advanced to the second round.

Matches

Replays

Second round
The second round took place on the weekend of 22 October. Along with the 18 winners from the first round, there were 14 new entries at this stage, two from the Lowland Football League, two from the Highland Football League and 10 from Scottish League Two.

Draw
The draw for the second round was hosted by Highland Football League champions Cove Rangers and took place at the Aberdeen Altens Hotel on Monday, 26 September at 6pm. Scottish Football Association president, Alex McRea oversaw the draw which was made by Nigg Community Council chairperson Alan Strachan.

Teams in Italics were not known at the time of the draw. Teams in Bold advanced to the third round.

Matches

Replays

Third round
The third round took place on the weekend of 26 November 2016. Along with the 16 winners from the second round, there were to be 16 new entries, 10 from Scottish League One and six from the Scottish Championship, at this stage.

Draw
The draw for the third round was made at 6pm on Tuesday, 25 October. The draw took place at Cappielow and was hosted by Greenock Morton. Chief Executive of the Greenock Morton Community Trust, Warren Hawke helped make the draw.

Teams in Italics were not known at the time of the draw. Teams in Bold advanced to the fourth round.

Matches

A total of nine third round ties were postponed due to frozen pitches. The St Mirren-Spartans, Beith Juniors-Greenock Morton, Clyde-Arbroath, Albion Rovers-Queen of the South and Stirling Albion-Wick Academy matches were postponed on Friday, 25 November, a day before they were due to take place after failing pitch inspections due to the freezing weather. These games were subsequently rearranged for 29 November, 3 and 6 December. The Queen's Park-Montrose match was originally scheduled for 29 November due to the League Cup final taking place at Hampden Park, Queen's Park's home ground, on 27 November. A further three games were postponed after failing early pitch inspections on Saturday, 26 November. These were the East Fife-Edinburgh City, Stranraer-East Kilbride and Brechin City-Ayr United matches. The Formartine United-Annan Athletic match originally passed a pitch inspection at 7am but was postponed after failing a supplementary inspection at 10:30am after temperatures in Pitmedden hadn't risen as expected.

Replays

Notes

Fourth round
The fourth round took place on the weekend of 21 January 2017. Along with the 16 winners from the third round, there were 16 new entries, four from the Scottish Championship and 12 from the Scottish Premiership, at this stage.
Ayr United became the first Scottish club to make four substitutions in a single match in their fourth round replay with Queen's Park. The Scottish FA's rule change at the start of the season to allow a fourth substitute to be used if a match went to extra time was used for the first time when Michael Rose replaced Nicky Devlin in the 121st minute of the match on 24 January 2017.

Draw
The draw for the fourth round was made at 6:35pm on Monday, 28 November. The draw was made at Rugby Park and hosted by Kilmarnock. It was made by Kilmarnock's 1997 Scottish Cup winning midfielder Gary Holt, alongside the Scottish Football Association President, Alan McRae, and Liz Poole-Adams from competition sponsors William Hill.

Teams in italics were not known at the time of the draw. Teams in Bold advanced to the fifth round.

Matches

Replays

Notes

Fifth round
The fifth round took place on the weekend of 11 February 2017.

Draw
The draw for the fifth round was made live on Sky Sports following the conclusion of the Albion Rovers-Celtic match on 22 January 2017. The draw was made by former Hibernian manager Alan Stubbs and Celtic fan Rod Stewart, who memorably performed his part of the draw in an enthusiastic manner.

Teams in italics were not known at the time of the draw. Teams in Bold advanced to the quarter-finals.

Matches

Replays

Quarter-finals
The quarter-finals took place on the weekend of 4 March 2017.

Draw
The draw for the quarter-finals was made live on Sky Sports following the conclusion of the Rangers-Greenock Morton match on 12 February 2017. The draw was conducted by seven-time Scottish Cup winner Alex McLeish.

Teams in italics were not known at the time of the draw. Teams in Bold advanced to the semi-finals.

Matches

Semi-finals
The semi-finals took place on the weekend of 22 April 2017.

Draw
The draw for the semi-finals was made live on Sky Sports News on 5 March 2017. The draw was made by Lisbon Lion Bertie Auld and Aberdeen's 1990 Scottish Cup winning manager Alex Smith.

Teams in Bold advanced to the final.

Matches

Final

Statistics

Top goalscorers

Broadcasting rights
From round four onwards, selected matches from the Scottish Cup are broadcast live in the UK and Ireland by BBC Scotland and Sky Sports. BBC Scotland has the option to show one tie per round with Sky Sports showing two ties per round with one replay also, Sky Sports show both semi-finals live with one also on BBC Scotland & both channels screen the final live.

The following matches are to be broadcast live on television:

References

External links
Official website
Format and dates

Scottish Cup seasons
2016–17 in Scottish football cups
Scottish Cup